Robert Popov (born 16 April 1982 in Strumica) is a retired footballer from North Macedonia.

Club career
Robert is a right defender or defensive midfielder. He started his career with FK Belasica. In 2003 Popov signed with Litex Lovech for a fee of 200.000 €. In May 2004 he helped them win the Bulgarian Cup. In January 2008 Robert Popov signed with AJ Auxerre. Popov had a serious injury while at Auxerre but when he recovered, he did not play much so both Popov and the club mutually agreed to terminate his contract in the summer of 2010.

International career
He made his senior debut for Macedonia in a July 2001 friendly match against Qatar and has earned a total of 17 caps, scoring no goals. His final international was a November 2009 friendly against Iran.

Personal life
He is the older brother of former national team left back Goran Popov.

References

External links

Profile at MacedonianFootball.com 

1982 births
Living people
Sportspeople from Strumica
Association football fullbacks
Macedonian footballers
North Macedonia international footballers
FK Belasica players
PFC Litex Lovech players
AJ Auxerre players
SC Kriens players
Macedonian First Football League players
First Professional Football League (Bulgaria) players
Ligue 1 players
Swiss Challenge League players
Macedonian expatriate footballers
Expatriate footballers in Bulgaria
Macedonian expatriate sportspeople in Bulgaria
Expatriate footballers in France
Macedonian expatriate sportspeople in France
Expatriate footballers in Switzerland
Macedonian expatriate sportspeople in Switzerland